Carposina bullata is a moth of the Carposinidae family. It is native to Trinidad and Tobago, but has been introduced to Hawaii as biological control agent of the weed Clidemia hirta.

The larvae feed on the fruit and flowers of Clidemia hirta.

References

Carposinidae
Moths described in 1913
Lepidoptera used as pest control agents